Thomas Nitschmann, born 8 June 1970, is a German karateka, currently 5th dan. A multiple medal winner in Karate  and Germany National Karate team coach.

References

1970 births
German male karateka
Shotokan practitioners
Karate coaches
Sportspeople from Duisburg
Living people
20th-century German people
21st-century German people